Barabanki Lok Sabha constituency (formerly known as Bara Banki Lok Sabha constituency) is one of the 80 Lok Sabha (parliamentary) constituencies in Uttar Pradesh state in northern India.

Assembly segments
Presently, Barabanki Lok Sabha constituency comprises six Vidhan Sabha (legislative assembly) segments. These are:

Members of Parliament
Following is the list of MPs from Barabanki:

Election Results

2019 Lok Sabha Elections

2014 Lok Sabha Elections

See also
 Barabanki district
 List of Constituencies of the Lok Sabha

Notes

External links
Barabanki lok sabha  constituency election 2019 result

Lok Sabha constituencies in Uttar Pradesh
Barabanki district